Cleveland Abduction is a 2015 American crime drama television film directed by Alex Kalymnios from a teleplay written by Stephen Tolkin. Based on the Ariel Castro kidnappings, the film stars Taryn Manning, Raymond Cruz and Joe Morton. It debuted May 2, 2015 on Lifetime.

The film is based on the memoir, Finding Me: A Decade of Darkness, a Life Reclaimed by Michelle Knight.

Plot
In Cleveland, Ohio, Michelle Knight (Manning) a 21-year-old single mother had lost custody of her son. On August 23, 2002, Knight was on her way to the court when she accepted a ride from her acquaintance Ariel Castro (Cruz), who was the father of a schoolmate. However, Castro abducted Knight and held her captive in his home. Finding strength through her belief in God and determined to be reunited with her son, Knight refused to be broken down by Castro. Soon thereafter Castro kidnaps and rapes two more girls, Amanda Berry (Droke) and Georgina "Gina" DeJesus (Sarife). These girls too become imprisoned along with Knight. They become friends and fellow victims; treat each other as sisters through their years in captivity.

When Berry became pregnant with Castro's child, it was Knight who delivered her baby, even performing CPR on the infant girl under the threat of Castro killing her if Berry's child didn't survive. Despite enduring more than a decade of brutality and captivity, Knight's spirit would not be broken as her faith in the face of what she once thought would be a hopeless situation was a testament to the human spirit. On May 6, 2013, Berry succeeds in escaping from the house and the police arrive and released the women. Knight is finally given the chance to reclaim her life after nearly 11 years of captivity.

Cast
 Taryn Manning as Michelle Knight
 Raymond Cruz as Ariel Castro
 Katie Sarife as Gina DeJesus
 Samantha Droke as Amanda Berry
 Pam Grier as Carla
 Joe Morton as Agent Solano

See also
Ariel Castro kidnappings - the case on which the book this movie was based on, was itself based on.

References

External links

Cleveland captivity abc story

2015 television films
2015 films
Lifetime (TV network) films
Biographical films about criminals
Films about kidnapping
Films about rape
Films set in 2002
Films set in 2013
Films set in Cleveland
Cultural depictions of kidnappers
Cultural depictions of rapists
Films with screenplays by Stephen Tolkin
2010s English-language films